Ignacio "Kiko" Cibrián is a Mexican-American guitarist, composer, arranger, record producer, recording engineer and mixer known for his work with Luis Miguel, Cristian Castro, Rocío Dúrcal REIK and Frank Sinatra. Cibrián has won one Grammy Award and three Latin Grammy Awards.

Early life and career 
Kiko Cibrián was born and grew up in Tijuana, Mexico where his father played in mariachis. At age 14, Cibrián started playing boleros and mariachi music. During his late teenage years, he joined a local band and was introduced to jazz by the band's saxophonist.

At 19, he was invited to go to Las Vegas to play with a band called "Santa Fe". During his time in Las Vegas, Cibrián also played with the University of Nevada, Las Vegas' big band.

In 1982, Cibrián moved to California to play with the band that accompanied dance performances at Disneyland. A year later, in San Diego, he joined the band "People Movers" where Nathan East played the electric bass. Cibrián returned to the Disneyland band in 1987 and then formed the band "True Stories".

In 1990, he moved to Mexico City to work with Luis Miguel as guitarist. That same year, Cibrián was invited to be the producer for Cristian Castro's debut album Agua nueva. It was his first time producing an album for another artist. Cibrián's second album as a producer was Luis Miguel's 1993 Aries which won a Grammy Award for Best Latin Pop Album. He composed the hit single "Suave" from that same album. Cibrián continued working with Luis Miguel as touring musician, producer, composer and arranger throughout the 1990s and 2000s.

Selected discography

Awards

BMI Latin Awards

|-
|rowspan="2" scope="row"| 1995
|scope="row"| "Suave"
|rowspan="4" scope="row"| Award-winning songs
| 
|-
|scope="row"| "Hasta el fin"
| 
|-
|rowspan="2" scope="row"| 1998
|"Dame"
| 
|-
|"Cómo es posible que a mi lado"
| 
|-

Grammy Awards

Latin Grammy Awards

References

External links
 

Living people
Grammy Award winners
Latin Grammy Award winners
Latin music record producers
Mexican male guitarists
American male guitarists
Mexican jazz musicians
Mexican session musicians
American male jazz musicians
20th-century American guitarists
21st-century American guitarists
20th-century American male musicians
21st-century American male musicians
Musicians from San Diego
People from Tijuana
1959 births
Latin music songwriters